Zelda is a 1993 American television movie based on the lives of author F. Scott Fitzgerald and his wife, Zelda Fitzgerald, artist and fellow author.

References

External links
 

1993 television films
1993 films
American biographical drama films
1990s biographical films
1990s English-language films
Films about mental health
Films directed by Pat O'Connor
Cultural depictions of F. Scott Fitzgerald
Biographical films about writers
American drama television films
1990s American films